The 1991 Volvo San Francisco was a men's  tennis tournament played on indoor carpet courts at the San Francisco Civic Auditorium in San Francisco, California in the United States and was part of the World Series of the 1991 ATP Tour. It was the 103rd edition of the tournament and was held from February 4 through February 10, 1991.  Sixth-seeded Darren Cahill won the singles title and earned $33,800 first-prize money.

Finals

Singles

 Darren Cahill defeated  Brad Gilbert 6–2, 3–6, 6–4
 It was Cahill's 1st singles title of the year and the 3rd and last of his career.

Doubles

 Wally Masur /  Jason Stoltenberg defeated  Ronnie Båthman /  Rikard Bergh 4–6, 7–6, 6–4

References